World Matchplay may refer to:
In golf
WGC Match Play, a World Golf Championships event
Volvo World Match Play Championship, an invitational event on the European Tour
Cisco World Ladies Match Play Championship, held in Japan in 2001 and 2002
HSBC Women's World Match Play Championship, LPGA event held 2005–7

In other sports
World Matchplay (darts)
World Matchplay (snooker)